Mazyadids may refer to:

Yazidids, also called Mazyadids, an Arab dynasty that ruled Shirvan in Azerbaijan from 861 to 1027